Evander Holyfield vs. Bert Cooper, billed as "The Homecoming", was a professional boxing match contested on November 23, 1991, for the WBA and IBF heavyweight championships.

Background
Holyfield was coming off a successful defense of his Undisputed Heavyweight Championship after defeating 42-year-old former Heavyweight champion George Foreman. Meanwhile, Mike Tyson had twice defeated Donvan "Razor" Ruddock to become the number one contender to Holyfield's titles. However, the two sides had trouble working out a deal and both men's camps began to look into having their respective fighter instead face Foreman. In July 1991, it was reported that a Holyfield–Foreman rematch was agreed upon, but only a day later it was announced that Holyfield and Tyson's promoters, Dan Duva and Don King had agreed to a blockbuster deal that would see Holyfield and Tyson meet on November 8, 1991, at the MGM Grand Garden Arena in Las Vegas. In addition, Holyfield and Tyson were expected to split a then-record $45 million purse with the champion Holyfield reportedly to earn $30 million, while the challenger Tyson would net $15 million. Unfortunately, a rib injury that Tyson had suffered, as well as his arrest and conviction for the alleged rape of Desiree Washington shortly after led to the fight being postponed and eventually cancelled. With Holyfield in need of an opponent, a match between Holyfield and former WBO Heavyweight champion Francesco Damiani was announced, with the bout to take place on November 23 in Holyfield's native Atlanta. Only days before the Holyfield–Damiani fight was to take place, it was announced that Damiani would be force to pull out of the match due to a foot injury he received while training. It was then announced that journeyman Bert Cooper would be Damiani's replacement to challenge Holyfield. As Cooper was unranked by the WBC, the organization refused to sanction the match, thus Holyfield's WBC title was not on the line.

The fight
Though Cooper was given little chance to defeat Holyfield, he nevertheless put on a decent showing against the champion. In the first round, Holyfield used his speed to take advantage of Cooper, consistently hitting him with several quick combinations. A little past midway through the round, Holyfield hit Cooper with a left hook to the body that dropped him to the canvas, though Cooper quickly got up and survived the rest of the round. After a solid second round from both fighters, Holyfield came out strong in the opening seconds of round 3, staggering Cooper with a left hook to the side of the head. As the first minute of the round was coming to a close, Cooper landed a right hand to Holyfield's head that staggered the champ. Cooper then got Holyfield against the ropes and landed a combination that included a right hand to the back of Holyfield's head. Before Holyfield could fall to the canvas, he grabbed the top rope to keep himself up. Despite not hitting the floor, referee Mills Lane called it a knockdown, the first of Holyfield's professional career. Cooper continued his attack on Holyfield, landing several powerful punches and nearly knocking him down again, but Holyfield held on to Cooper just as he was about to go down. As the second minute passed, Holyfield regained his form and proceeded to land a powerful combination of his own. The two men traded punches for nearly the entire final minute of the round, but both men survived without any further knockdowns. After three more rounds, Holyfield ended the fight late in round 7. With 20 seconds to go in the round, Holyfield hit Cooper with a long combination. Though Cooper never went down, he could no longer defend himself, causing Lane to stop the fight with two seconds left in the round and award Holyfield the victory via technical knockout.

References

1991 in boxing
Boxing matches in Atlanta
1991 in sports in Georgia (U.S. state)
Cooper
World Boxing Council heavyweight championship matches
World Boxing Association heavyweight championship matches
International Boxing Federation heavyweight championship matches
November 1991 sports events in the United States